MSU Faculty of Medicine or FBM/FFM MSU is a medical faculty in Moscow State University.  Founded in 1992 by an order of the Rector of Moscow State University, Professor V.A.Sadovnichy, FBM MSU is one of the institutions of higher learning in medicine in Russian Federation.

The medical faculty has a faculty to support its missions of education, research, and clinical care.  In addition, FBM MSU collaborates on contractual terms with therapy, surgical and preventive treatment institutes of Ministry of Health and Academy of Medical Sciences, city hospitals and maternity houses.  Many departments of FBM MSU function on the basis of research centres and institutes namely RAMS Research Centre of Surgery; RAMS Oncology Research Centre, Cardiology Research Centre; P.A. Priorov Research Institute of Traumatology and Orthopedics; RAMS Research Institute of Eye Diseases; P.A. Herzen Moscow Institute of Oncology; P.K. Anokhin Institute of Human Physiology; Research Institute of Forensic Medicine; RAMS Research Centre of Endocrinology; Research Institute of Phtysiopulmonology; Research Institute of Medical Parasitological and Tropical Medicine.

Prospective students apply to one of two tracks:
M.D. program (emphasizes on problem-based learning)
M.D. - Ph.D. program (emphasizes on medical research)

The current dean of the medical school is Professor Vsevolod Tkachuk.

History
Moscow University was founded on January 25, 1755 by a decree of the Empress Elizaveta Petrovna on the initiative of the Russian scientist Mikhail Lomonosov.  In 1755 Moscow University had three faculties namely Philosophy, Jurisprudence and Medicine.

According to the original plan suggested by Mikhail Lomonosov, the medical faculty was supposed to teach chemistry, natural history, botany, zoology, agronomics and anatomy.  Semen Gerasimovich Zybelin was amongst the first group of student from the faculty.

In the 19th century, the development of medical and scientific activity in the medical faculty continued. The medical faculty received bases for clinical training and many new departments were created namely anatomy, physiology and pathology, therapy, pharmacology, medical literature, surgery, obstetrics and veterinary medicine. It became the first Moscow state medical institute. Nowadays the institute named as Moscow Medical Academy named after I.M. Sechenov. In 1992, the Faculty of Basic (or Fundamental) Medicine was created by an order of the rector of Moscow State University, Professor V.A.Sadovnichy.

Departments
The faculty mainly composed of twelve departments:
Therapy- Professor V. E. Nonikov (head)
Surgery - RAMS member, Professor N. N. Malinovsky (head)
Pharmacology - Professor O. S. Medvedev (head)
Internal medicine - RAMS member, Professor N. A. Muhin (head)
Obstetrics and Gynecology - RAMS member, Professor G. M. Savelyeva (head)
Multidisciplinary Clinical Training - RAMS member, Professor S. P. Mironov (head)
Normal and Topographical Anatomy - RAMS member, Professor M. R. Sapin (head)
Biological and Medical Chemistry - RAMS member, Professor V. A. Tkachuk (head)
Pathology - RAMS corresponding member, Professor Yu. L. Perov (head)
Physical and Chemical Basis of Medicine - RAMS member, Professor Yu. A. Vladimirov (head)
Ecological and Extreme Medicine - RAS and RAMS member, Professor A. I. Grigoriev (head)
Normal and Pathological Physiology - Professor V. B. Koshelev (head)

Academic staff:
10 RAMS members
27 professors with M.D.
31 professors holding M.D. - Ph.D.
30 professors with Ph.D.

Recent development
In 2002, the government of Moscow city issued an order concerning the construction of MSU medical clinic combining with a hospital. The clinic is plan to be of both scientific and clinical value assisting researchers in their studies and providing many opportunities for medical practise to students, professors and staff as well as residents.

Short-term programs
These programs are basically for students from overseas.   For postgraduate students, the faculty offers a special biomedical research under the supervision of related specialists.

Collaboration
The faculty is in internationally collaboration with:
International Medical Association
German Association for Academic Exchange (DAAD)
Tohoku University (Sendai, Japan)
Humboldt University of Berlin (Germany)
Regensburg University (Germany)
National Institutes of Health (United States)
State University of New York (United States)
George Mason University (Virginia, United States)
Central Clinical Hospital (CKB) under the Administration of the President of Russian Federation
I.M.Sechenov Moscow Medical Academy
N. I. Pirogov Moscow Medical University

Notable alumni
Pyotr Gannushkin and Sergei Korsakoff - psychiatrists
Ivan Sechenov - physiologist
Nikolay Ivanovich Pirogov and Nikolay Sklifosovskiy and Ivan Tsimailo - surgeons
Anton Chekhov - author

External links
Homepage of the Faculty of Fundamental Medicine 
FAIMER International Medical Education Directory
Ministry of Health of the Russian Federation

See also

Education in the Soviet Union
Education in Moscow
Medical schools in Russia